SMS Eber was the last of the six gunboats of the  of the German Imperial Navy prior to and during World War I.  Other ships of the class are SMS Iltis, SMS Luchs, SMS Tiger, SMS Jaguar and SMS Panther.  They were built between 1898 and 1903. All of them served primarily overseas, in the German colonies. Eber had a crew of 9 officers and 121 men.

Design

She displaced  at full load. Her propulsion system consisted of a pair of vertical triple-expansion steam engines each driving a single screw propeller, with steam supplied by four coal-fired Thornycroft boilers. She had a crew of 9 officers and 121 enlisted men. Eber was armed with a main battery of two  SK L/40 guns, with 482 rounds of ammunition. She also carried six machine guns.

Service history
The keel for Eber was laid down at the AG Vulcan in Stettin in 1902, much later than her five sister ships. She was launched on 6 June 1902 and commissioned into the German fleet on 15 September that year to begin sea trials. Following the completion of her initial testing, Eber remained out of service for the next seven years. The lengthy period in the reserve for a brand new vessel prompted an official inquiry from the Reichstag (Imperial Diet). The Reichsmarineamt (Imperial Navy Office) reported that Eber had been intended to serve as a reserve vessel that could be activated to respond to a crisis or to replace a damaged or lost vessel; this response generated laughter during the Reichstag session when the navy's representative read it.

Eber was activated for her first period of active service in early 1910, to join her sister ship  on the western coast of Africa. She departed Wilhelmshaven, Germany, on 14 April and arrived in Douala, the capital of the German colony of Kamerun, on 14 July. The ship's activity during the deployment was characterized by routine visits to ports along the western coast of Africa to show the flag. The tropical climate was difficult for the crews, which were replaced every year, unlike the two-year term for crews assigned to other foreign stations. Eber also routinely visited the Canary Islands and Cape Town to give the crew respites from the tropical heat; during periods in Cape Town, repair work was typically done as well. In early 1911, Eber sailed to Cadiz, Spain, where her annual overhaul was carried out from 7 January to 6 March. On the way back to west Africa, the ship stopped to visit Casablanca in Morocco. Eber thereafter arrived in Douala in May, but in late June she was sent back to the Moroccan coast in response to the Agadir Crisis. She was to replace Panther, which had stopped there only temporarily on her way back to Germany. Eber anchored in the Agadir roadstead with the light cruiser  through November, by which time the crisis had been resolved. During this period, she left only briefly to replenish coal and supplies at Las Palmas or Santa Cruz in the Canaries. After Eber and Berlin were ordered to leave Morocco, the two ships had to seek shelter at Tanger and Casablanca to avoid severe storms.

By late January 1912, Eber had arrived back in Douala. In mid-March, she cruised south to visit German Southwest Africa before proceeding further south to Cape Town on 29 March. There, the ship's captain and first officer were disembarked, as they had fallen seriously ill and had to be returned home. The senior watch officer temporarily took command while a replacement captain traveled from Germany. In late August and into September, Eber cruised in the Congo River, and later that year, she visited Cabinda in Portuguese Congo and Boma in Belgian Congo. In late November, the outbreak of unrest in Monrovia, Liberia, prompted Eber to go there to protect German interests. She was joined by Panther and the light cruiser . By early February 1913, Eber had returned to Kamerun, but she was scheduled to be sent south to Cape Town for an overhaul. This order was rescinded, however, after an experiment the previous year with Panther had demonstrated that it was more cost effective to bring a gunboat back to Germany for the overhaul than it was to pay a foreign shipyard to do the work. Eber accordingly left Kamerun for Germany at the end of February, and the overhaul was carried out in Wilhelmshaven in May and June.

Eber departed for Kamerun again on 25 June with a survey team aboard, who were to complete the survey of the Gulf of Guinea, which had been suspended since 1905. Eber continued her survey work in the Gulf of Guinea until early July, when she sailed south for another overhaul at Cape Town. The dramatic rise in tensions in Europe between the Central Powers (which included Germany) and the Triple Entente over the Assassination of Archduke Franz Ferdinand that culminated in the July Crisis prompted the German navy to cancel Ebers scheduled overhaul and direct her to return to German colonial territory. She sailed back north on 30 July. The British commander of naval forces in the area, Admiral Herbert King-Hall, had ordered the local authorities to prevent Eber from leaving, but they failed to do so.

World War I
On 2 August, Eber arrived in Lüderitz in German Southwest Africa, where she was then in the range of the wireless telegraph transmitter in Berlin. There, the ship's commander learned of the mobilization order that had been issued the previous day. According to the orders, Eber was to cross the Atlantic to the eastern coast of South America, where she was to locate a German steamer suitable for use as an auxiliary cruiser, which Eber was to arm with some of her own guns. In company with several German steamships acting as colliers, Eber departed for the coast of Brasil, arriving off the remote Brazilian island of Trindade and Martim Vaz. There, she remained for the next several days; while waiting for a suitable passenger ship, Eber briefly met the light cruiser  on 20 August. Three days later, the liner  arrived, and over the coming days, both of Ebers 10.5 cm guns were moved to the ship, along with most of her officers and crew.

Cap Trafalgar departed on 4 September to begin the commerce raiding campaign, while Eber, having been disarmed, sailed under a commercial flag to try to reach a Brazilian port. Eber reached Salvador, Bahia on 14 September, where she remained for the next three years. Cap Trafalgars raiding career was brief; the same day that Eber arrived in Salvador, Cap Trafalgar was caught and sunk by the armed merchant cruiser Carmania. In late 1917, Brazil entered the war on the side of the Triple Entente, and to prevent her capture, Ebers remaining crew set the ship on fire on 26 October and then scuttled her by opening her sea valves.

Notes

References

Further reading

Ships built in Stettin
Iltis-class gunboats
1903 ships
World War I naval ships of Germany
World War I shipwrecks in the Atlantic Ocean
Maritime incidents in 1917
Scuttled vessels